Euriphene kiki, or Kiki's nymph, is a butterfly in the family Nymphalidae. It is found in Nigeria. The habitat consists of forests.

It is known only from the holotype male which was found in a patch of relict forest that has since been destroyed.

References

Butterflies described in 1980
Euriphene
Endemic fauna of Nigeria
Butterflies of Africa